Madora may mean:

 Agilea Madora, soprano character in Handel's opera Teseo
 Madora Bay, Western Australia
 Madora, a jazz group founded by Luis Días (composer)
 Susanna Madora Salter (1860-1961) first woman elected in the US as a mayor
 Madora, caterpillar of the moth Gonimbrasia belina

See also
 Madura